Northern Song may refer to:

 The Song Dynasty in China, 960–1127
 Northern Songs, The Beatles' music publishing company
 "Only a Northern Song", a song by The Beatles
 Northern Song (song), a song by Ruslana
 Northern Song, an album by Steve Tibbetts